Matthew Richard Robinson (born 23 December 1974) is an English football manager and former professional footballer.

As a player, he was a full back who notably played in the Premier League for Southampton, before switching to rivals Portsmouth. He later played in the Football League for Reading and Oxford United before moving into non-league football with Forest Green Rovers and Totton.

He later had a spell as player/manager of Swindon Supermarine, before later joining Chippenham Town as a coach.

Playing career
Having represented Dorset Schools, Robinson  joined Southampton as a trainee in July 1991, signing as a professional in 1993. His career at Southampton suffered from the rapid turnover of managers and in little over four years, he served under five different managers. He only made 14 appearances (of which 11 were from the bench) for Southampton before joining Portsmouth for £50,000 in February 1998.

At Portsmouth, he was Alan Ball's second signing as manager and he went straight into the side at left-back. His career also suffered from frequent managerial changes, but in his two years at Fratton Park, Robinson chalked up more than 75 games, including 69 league appearances and scoring one goal, before moving to Reading in a £150,000 deal in January 2000.

Robinson played another 75 league and cup games for Reading before he headed to Oxford United in July 2002 on a free transfer. A regular for Oxford, Robinson amassed 192 games in just over four years.

Another free transfer took him to Forest Green Rovers in September 2006 where he made thirty Conference appearances. In May 2007, he joined Salisbury City on a part-time basis and is now training to be a police officer. After a successful period with Salisbury, Robinson left the club and signed for A.F.C. Totton in February 2009.

In 2010, Robinson joined Southern League side Swindon Supermarine as player-manager. The 2011–12 season was a hard season for Swindon Supermarine finishing third from bottom under the management of Matt Robinson and Gary Horgan. With the appointment of Highworth manager Dave Webb and assistant Lee Spalding the club hoped Robinson would still play for the club and Horgan would take a coaching role. Robinson left Supermarine in April 2012.

Personal life
Robinson is now a Police Officer.

In November 2021, Robinson spoke candidly about how it was difficult to be accepted by Portsmouth fans following his transfer from Southampton.

Career statistics

References

External links

1974 births
Living people
Sportspeople from Exeter
Footballers from Devon
English footballers
Southampton F.C. players
Portsmouth F.C. players
Reading F.C. players
Oxford United F.C. players
Salisbury City F.C. players
A.F.C. Totton players
Premier League players
Swindon Supermarine F.C. players
Association football defenders